Wrecked: Life in the Crash Lane is an American reality television series that was produced by NorthSouth Productions for the Speed Channel. The show followed the O'Hare Towing Service's owners and tow truck operators, focusing primarily on vehicle recoveries throughout the Chicago metropolitan area. The show focuses on O'Hare's heavy-duty, 25–60-ton tow trucks, performing recoveries on semi-trailer trucks and other large vehicles.  Speed ceased being available to most American viewers as a standalone network with its own original programming on August 17, 2013, when it was replaced by the general-interest sports network Fox Sports 1.

Premise
Bill and Marci Gratzianna, the owners of O'Hare Towing Service, sent in a tape showing O'Hare's operation to the production company only after his wife convinced him on the idea of the show. Bill decided to do the show because "it would help his company and give his drivers the recognition they deserve."

The first season premiered on July 17, 2008. The second season began on May 21, 2009. National Geographic Channel begin airing Season 1 on February 21, 2009. The second season of Wrecked aired as part of Speed's Big Block Thursday lineup with Pinks All Out and Jacked.

References

External links
NorthSouth Productions
O'Hare Towing

Speed (TV network) original programming
Automotive television series
2000s American reality television series
2008 American television series debuts
2009 American television series endings
Television shows set in Chicago